Esigodini, originally known as Essexvale, is a town in the Matabeleland South Province of Zimbabwe. It is the administrative centre for Umzingwane District, one of the seven administrative districts in Matabeleland South. It was originally an estate of Frederick Selous.

Location
The geographical coordinates of the town are:20°17'33.0"S, 28°56'17.0"E (Latitude:-20.292500; Longitude:28.938056).

Overview
Esigodini is the district capital of  Umzingwane Rural District Council, which is responsible for running the affairs of the district as a whole. The trading centre is surrounded by ranches and mixed farms. The surrounding communities also host gold, dams and tungsten mines. The area has many rivers, although it suffers from long dry season and drought is common in this area.

Population
According to the 1982 population census, Esigodini had a population of 1,492. The 2012 national population census and household survey enumerated 2,228 inhabitants in the town.

History
The town was officially known as Essexvale until 1982, when the name changed to  Esigodini. It was founded in 1894. Prior to the coming of European settlers, the surrounding area was settled by Rozi Moyo people, who had moved here from the area near Gwanda.

Schools
Nearby schools include Falcon College, a renowned secondary school for boys and Mzingwane High School,  Mvuthu High School, while primary schools are  Bayethe, Bezha, Bonjeni, Carlisle, Dobi, Doyana, Dula, Esigodini, Glen Grey, Godlwayo Annex, How Mine, Impu, Inyankuni, Irisvale, Isotsha, Kumbudzi, Longfield, Malungwane, Matopo, Matshetshe, Mawabeni, Mbalabala, Mbizingwe, Mlomoliwoto, Mpisini, Mpofini, Mtshede, Munkula, Mvuthu, . Also nearby, is the Roman Catholic mission school known as Sacred Heart Girls School, a boarding secondary school. This school was founded in 2014 and is run by the Sisters Of The Precious Blood who fall under the Roman Catholic Archdiocese of Bulawayo, and came mainly from Germany shortly after the Second World War.

See also
 Northern Ndebele people

References

External links
Zanu-PF Heads Meet In Esigodini As of 15 October 2018.

Umzingwane District
Populated places in Matabeleland South Province